Virgibacillus proomii is a species of Gram-positive bacteria. Strains of this species were originally isolated from soil samples in England and formerly identified as strains of Bacillus pantothenticus. The species is named for British microbiologist Harold Proom.

References

External links
Type strain of Virgibacillus proomii at BacDive -  the Bacterial Diversity Metadatabase

Bacillaceae
Bacteria described in 1999